Whites Hall, also referred to as Whiteshall or Whites Hall Farm, is the birthplace and boyhood home of famous Maryland native Johns Hopkins.  Whites Hall is located in Gambrills, Maryland.

History
Whites Hall was originally part of an 1,800-acre land grant to Colonel Jerome White in 1665. The house itself was constructed between 1780 and 1784. The home was designed as a two-story, brick side passage double pile plan dwelling, and was listed on the Maryland Historic Site inventory in 1969.

Johns Hopkins was born at the home on May 19, 1795, to Samuel Hopkins (1759–1814)  and Hannah Janney (1774–1864). A family of Quaker beliefs, the Hopkins family enslaved Black people for some years before freeing them in 1807 in accordance with their local Society of Friends decree. Johns Hopkins lived on the property until he reached the age of 17 in 1812, when he left for Baltimore. 

The property would remain in the Hopkins family until 1910 when it was sold off for inheritance. Today, the previous manor house is surrounded by residential development and the Walden Golf Club.

Restoration, and a 'Model Program' to Honor the Enslaved of Whites Hall
In 2016, Millersville-based housing developer Polm Companies planned to demolish the historic home for additional space for residential lots. Its potential demolition galvanized an effort by preservation and historic activists, who worked with the developer in an effort to save the mansion. 

In 2017, the Maryland nonprofit organization, The Johns Hopkins House, Inc., was organized to save and restore Whites Hall. It is recognized as a tax-exempt 501(c)(3) organization by the U.S. Internal Revenue Service.  Current fundraising events include weekly outdoor beer gardens from May to October.  The Johns Hopkins House, Inc. intends to open the property up to the public.  Plans include restoring the Whites Hall manor house and operating it as a country inn/restaurant/tavern, constructing an 18th century barn on the property for use as a cafe, bakery, wedding reception area and restaurant seating.  The large 10-acre field that fronts the house is slated to be developed into an arboretum, bird sanctuary and community park.  There are also plans to locate a dozen colonial cottages on the property for overnight stay.

A museum is also slated to be created on the expansive property, intended to explore the complex life of Johns Hopkins, but especially intended to reveal the lives and struggles of the enslaved people who worked the Whites Hall plantation.  One of the country's leading authorities on the culture of Chesapeake Bay slavery and, in particular, the variability of the habitations of the enslaved will be overseeing the construction of a representative slave cabin on the Whites Hall property.

The Johns Hopkins House, Inc. will be creating a Scholarship Program to honor the enslaved people of Whites Hall.  All excess revenues from the operation of the property will fund annual academic scholarships for African-American students residing in Maryland.  Each scholarship will be in the name of a former enslaved person who worked at the Whites Hall plantation.  This scholarship program is believed to be the first of its kind in the United States... a direct effort to make reparations for the period of slavery in the U.S., and act as a model for others to follow.

See also
Clifton, Hopkins's later home in Baltimore
Linthicum Walks, another historic home in Crofton

References

Houses in Anne Arundel County, Maryland
Farms in Maryland
Houses completed in 1792
Plantation houses in Maryland
Johns Hopkins University